Ghimire is one of the surnames of the  Brahmin (upadhya bahun) varna belonging to Kashyap Gotra in the Hindu Varna System. They have been living in the hilly regions of Nepal for 2000 years. The earliest known ancestor, the royal priest Gudpal Vyas (also known by Gudpal Bias), lived in Ghamir, Dhurkot, (now called Ghamir, Gulmi, Nepal) who moved from Ujjain, which was ruled by King Vikramaditya, ancient city situated on the eastern bank of the Kshipra River in the Malwa region of central India. Which is today part of the state of Madhya Pradesh, and it is the administrative centre of Ujjain District and Ujjain Division.
Research Scholar, Parashu Ram Ghimire argues that the Brahmins who migrated from Ghamir to Musikot were called Ghamire/Ghimire, later in Musikot. In this logic claims Ghimire first started in Musikot.

Etymology

Ghimire is the surname of Nepalis who lived in Ghamir, starting from sons of Gudpal Bias. Their surname changed according to the places they lived. Kashyapa Rishi is their earliest ancestor and their sons are called as Kashyapai lived in Kaskikot, now in Kaski, Nepal. When Kashyapai moved to Ujjain, in the Malwa Region (now in Madhya Pradesh India), they took the surname Bias (or Vyas). Sandipani Bias was a notable Rishi, the Guru of Lord Krishna and Balarama. The surname Bias can still be seen in parts of India. When Gudpal Bias moved toward Nepal, and lived in Dhamir, Research Scholar, Parashu Ram Ghimire strongly claims that the place is "Ghamir" not 'Dhamir' Dhurkot, their sons are called as Ghamire and simultaneously into Ghimire.
The three genealogical Rishis (Tripravar) are Kashyapa, Avatsara, Naidhruva.

Lineage

History

Ghimire are the children of Kashyapa Rishi. Kashyapa, who spent his life in Kaskikot, now in Kaski, Nepal and their children moved on to Ujjainin the Malwa region of central India from Nepal. Ghimire are those, who again moved to Nepal near the date when Vikram Samvat was established by Vikramaditya. Gudpal Bias was the Royal Purohit, known as Royal Priest, of Vikramaditya. This has caused the Ghimires to believe that they have been here for more than 2000 years. Their ancestor named Gudpal Bias settled in Ghamir from Ujjain. Gudpal Bias entered Western Nepal through the route of Kumaon, Garhwal and Jumla from Ujjain.

Earliest known ancestors

Gudpal Bias is the first known ancestor Of Ghimire Settled in Dhamir from Ujjain. He belong to Family of Sandipani Bias. He is the Royal Purohit, Known as Royal Priest, of Vikramaditya, who establish Vikram Samvat, now official Calendar of Nepal.

Controversy theory

1.Gudpal Bias Entered Nepal in 14th century during the Mughal Empire in Ujjain when Mughal Emperors forced to change his Hindu Religion.

2. Gudpal Bias  's wife died at place named Shiva Kanya.

Notable people with surname Ghimire

 
Durga Ghimire, Nepali social activist
Jagadish Ghimire, Nepalese Writer
Jhamak Ghimire, Nepali writer
Kedar Ghimire, Nepali comedian
Kunjana Ghimire, Nepali comedian
Madhav Prasad Ghimire, National Poet of Nepal
Shrawan Ghimire, Nepali actor
Tulsi Ghimire, Indian film director

References

Surnames of Nepalese origin
Khas people
Khas surnames